Country Comfort is an American comedy streaming television series created by Caryn Lucas that premiered on Netflix on March 19, 2021. In July 2021, the series was canceled after one season.

Cast and characters

Main

 Katharine McPhee as Bailey, a country singer who takes a job as a nanny after getting kicked out of her up-and-coming band with her boyfriend
 Eddie Cibrian as Beau, a cowboy and widower who is raising five children alone in his ranch known as Harmony Hills
 Ricardo Hurtado as Tuck, Beau's eldest son
 Jamie Martin Mann as Brody, Beau's 15-year-old son
 Griffin McIntyre as Dylan, Beau's 12-year-old son
 Shiloh Verrico as Cassidy, Beau's 9-year-old daughter
 Pyper Braun as Chloe, Beau's 6-year-old daughter and the youngest of Beau's children

Recurring

 Janet Varney as Summer, Beau's girlfriend
 Eric Balfour as Boone, Bailey's ex-boyfriend

Notable guest star
 LeAnn Rimes as herself

Episodes

Production

Development
On January 30, 2020, Netflix gave Country Comfort a series order consisting of ten episodes. The series is created and executive produced by Caryn Lucas. On July 2, 2021, Netflix canceled the series after one season.

Casting
Upon series order announcement, Katharine McPhee, Eddie Cibrian, Ricardo Hurtado, Jamie Martin Mann, Pyper Braun, Shiloh Verrico, and Griffin McIntyre were cast to star. On February 12, 2020, Eric Balfour and Janet Varney joined the cast in recurring roles.

Filming
The series was filmed at Sunset Bronson Studios in Hollywood, California, but it is set in Nashville, Tennessee.

Release
The series premiered on March 19, 2021.

Reception

Critical response
The review aggregator website Rotten Tomatoes reported an approval rating of 50% based on 6 critic reviews, with an average rating of 5.67/10.

Accolades 
The series won Outstanding Cinematography For A Multi-Camera Series for the "Crazy" episode with George Mooradian as the cinematographer at the Primetime Emmy Awards.

References

External links
 
 

2020s American workplace comedy television series
2020s American musical comedy television series
2021 American television series debuts
2021 American television series endings
Country music television series
English-language Netflix original programming
Primetime Emmy Award-winning television series
Television series about fictional musicians
Television shows set in Tennessee